Hot l Baltimore is a 1975 American sitcom created by Norman Lear, adapted from the 1973 off-Broadway play The Hot l Baltimore by Lanford Wilson.

Premise and run
The show takes place in the fictional Hotel Baltimore in Baltimore, Maryland, and draws its title from the cheap establishment's neon marquee which has a burned-out letter "E". The half-hour series premiered January 24, 1975, and was produced by Norman Lear for ABC.  It was the first Lear property to air on ABC.

The series had several controversial elements, including two primary characters who were prostitutes, one of whom was an illegal immigrant, and one of the first gay couples to be depicted on an American television series.  Because of the subject matter, the show was the first ABC network show to have a warning at its opening, cautioning viewers about mature themes.  (All in the Family, also produced by Lear, ran a similar disclaimer when it debuted in 1971 on CBS, but ceased doing so with its second telecast.)  The network supported the show and gave it a full publicity campaign, but it failed to win an audience and was canceled after 13 episodes.  Its last telecast was June 6, 1975.

This series is notable as the first failure for Lear after a streak of mega-hit TV series, beginning with All in the Family (1971) and continuing with Sanford and Son (1972), Maude (1972), Good Times (1974), and The Jeffersons (1975), the last of which premiered six days before this show. It finished the season in 69th place out of 84 shows with an average 14.7 rating.

Cast
 James Cromwell as Bill Lewis, the hotel's desk clerk
 Richard Masur as Clifford Ainsley, the hotel's young manager
 Conchata Ferrell as April Green, a prostitute who likes Bill
 Jeannie Linero as Suzy Marta Rocket, a prostitute and alien with no legal status 
 Al Freeman Jr. as Charles Bingham, a wise middle-aged man
 Gloria LeRoy as Millie, a daffy waitress
 Robin Wilson as Jackie, a young tomboy and runaway 
 Stan Gottlieb as Mr. Morse, a grouchy old man
 Lee Bergere as George, a gay middle-aged man
 Henry Calvert as Gordon, George's middle-aged boyfriend
 Charlotte Rae as Mrs. Bellotti, an eccentric woman with a never-seen psychotic son

Episodes

References

External links
 

1970s American sitcoms
1975 American television series debuts
1975 American television series endings
American Broadcasting Company original programming
1970s American LGBT-related television series
Television series by Sony Pictures Television
Television shows set in Baltimore
Television series based on plays
English-language television shows
1970s American comedy television series
American LGBT-related sitcoms